Valiyaparamba (Malayalam: വലിയപറമ്പ) is a coastal island in Hosdurg taluk, Kasaragod district, Kerala state, India.

Location

Valiyaparamba is separated from the mainland by Kavvayi Backwater. The island's main source of income is from agriculture and fishing. The island has 13 wards ruling by each ward member to leading the Valiyaparamba Panchayat.

Geography

Valiyaparamba is fed by four rivers and dotted with numerous little islands. Valiyaparamba, a hinterland separated from the mainland, is a noted fishing centre in the district. A Bekal Fort stands on a headland that runs into the sea. A National Waterway passes through the island.

Education
The island has seven primary schools, one higher secondary school.

Transportation

The island is separated from the mainland and accessible by transport boat service or by crossing the Mavila Kadappuram Bridge.

National Highway (NH 17) passes through Cheruvathur.

See also
Payyannur
Peringome 20 km from Payyanur
Ezhimala 12 km from Payyanur Town
Kunhimangalam village 8 km from Payyanur town
Kavvayi Island 3 km from Payyanur
Ramanthali 7 km from Payyanur
Karivellur 10 km from Payyanur
Trikarpur 6 km from Payyanur
Padne
Cheruvathur

References

about Valiyaparamba
Villages in Kasaragod district